Wolcott is a census-designated place (CDP) comprising the central community in the town of Wolcott, Lamoille County, Vermont, United States. The CDP was first drawn for the 2020 census.

Geography
Wolcott village is in the southern part of the town of Wolcott, on both sides of the Lamoille River. Vermont Route 15 passes through the village, following the north side of the river. Route 15 leads west  to Morrisville and southeast  to Hardwick.

References

Census-designated places in Vermont
 Wolcott
Census-designated places in Lamoille County, Vermont